Qiemo may refer to:

 Qiemo County
 Qiemo Town
 Qiemo River